Ernst Joll (10 September 1902 – 4 March 1935) was an Estonian professional journalist and  footballer who played as a winger for the Estonian national football team.

Career
For the Estonian national football team, he played 23 games and scored 4 goals. He took part in the 1924 Olympic Games Football Tournament. He created the goal in Finland in the first winning football match against Finland on September 30, 1923. He worked, in 1921 as a sports reporter and since 1925 as a sports editor. Joll was buried at the Rahumäe Jaan Cemetery.

References

1902 births
1935 deaths
Footballers from Tallinn
People from the Governorate of Estonia
Estonian footballers
Olympic footballers of Estonia
Footballers at the 1924 Summer Olympics
Burials at Rahumäe Cemetery
Association football wingers
Estonia international footballers